is a Japanese science fiction writer.

His debut as a writer was in 1985 in Hayakawa SF Magazine. In 1988 he won the Seiun Award with "Mountaintop Symphony". He is known for his unique style, influenced by magic realism. His most famous work is the  series, a western-like science fiction of seven volumes (published in 1987-1989).

He is a graduate of Musashi University.

Works in English translation
 (Speculative Japan 2, Kurodahan Press, 2011)

Sources

Seed, David. A Companion to Science Fiction. Wiley-Blackwell, 2005, p. 329. 
Tatsumi, Takayuki. "Generations and Controversies: An Overview of Japanese Science Fiction, 1957-1997", Science Fiction Studies, Vol. 27, No. 1 (March 2000), pp. 105-114.

External links

Japanese science fiction writers
1952 births
Living people